The canton of Portes d'Ariège is an administrative division of the Ariège department, southern France. It was created at the French canton reorganisation which came into effect in March 2015. Its seat is in Saverdun.

It consists of the following communes:
 
La Bastide-de-Lordat
Bonnac
Brie
Canté
Esplas
Gaudiès
Justiniac
Labatut
Lissac
Mazères
Montaut
Saint-Quirc
Saverdun
Trémoulet
Le Vernet
Villeneuve-du-Paréage

References

Cantons of Ariège (department)